Vondh is a village in Kutch district, Gujarat state, India. The village is 7 km from the city of Bhachau. Vondh is overseen by a Sarpanch.

Transportation 
Vondh has a railway station at its north and it has 6 lane highway (+2 way service road on each side) at its south. Vondh is 7 km east of Bhachau and 350 km from Ahmedabad.

Education 
Vondh has 3 schools.

Villages in Kutch district